Leucophrye is also the mythical ancient name for the island of Tenedos, see Tenes.

In Greek mythology, Leucophrye was the daughter of Mandrolytus, a resident (possibly the ruler) of a city in Asia Minor.

Mythology 
Leucippus, son of Xanthius, was chosen by the oracle as leader of a colony, one of ten sent out of Pherae by Admetus (sending out such colonies was a common practice to avoid overpopulation). In search for a new place to settle, he was involved in a military conflict with the native city of Mandrolytus, and besieged it. Leucophrye fell in love with Leucippus and betrayed the city to him. It is not known whether Leucippus answered her feelings and what her further destiny was. Leucophrye's story is similar to those of Comaetho, Scylla (princess) and Pisidice of Methymna, all of which ended tragically for the heroines.

Note

Reference 
 Parthenius, Love Romances. Transl. by S. Gaselee (1916) at Classical E-text

Women in Greek mythology

Characters in Greek mythology